Model Town is a tehsil located in Lahore District, Punjab, Pakistan. The population is 2,698,235 according to the 2017 census.

Settlements
Kahna Nau
Lahore Metropolitan Corporation

See also 
 List of tehsils of Punjab, Pakistan

References 

Tehsils of Punjab, Pakistan
Populated places in Lahore District